Ewbank is both a given name and a surname. Notable people with the name include:

As a given name
Andrew Ewbank Burn (1864–1927), English clergyman

As a surname
Inga-Stina Ewbank (1932–2004), Swedish educator
John Ewbank (climber) (1948–2013), Australian rock climber
John Ewbank (composer) (born 1968), Dutch composer, lyricist, and record producer
John Wilson Ewbank (1799–1847), English painter
Louis Ewbank (1864–1953), Justice of the Indiana Supreme Court
Weeb Ewbank (1907–1998), American football coach

See also
Eubank, a surname